Major-General Duncan Francis Capps  (born 21 December 1966) is a British Army officer. He served as Commandant of the Royal Military Academy Sandhurst from 2020 to 2022.

Early life and education
Capps was born on 21 December 1966 in Slough, Berkshire, England. He was educated at Charters School, a comprehensive school in Sunningdale, Berkshire. He graduated from Cranfield University with a Master of Arts (MA) degree in 1999.

Military career
Capps was commissioned into the Royal Corps of Transport on 13 December 1986. He was Commanding Officer of 7 Regiment Royal Logistic Corps from 2006 to 2008.

He became Deputy Chief of Staff, Headquarters 1st (United Kingdom) Armoured Division in December 2008, commander 104th Logistic Support Brigade in August 2011 and commander, Joint Force Support in Afghanistan in December 2012. He went on to be Assistant Chief of Staff (Logistics) at Permanent Joint Headquarters in November 2013, Head of Defence Supply Chain Operations and Movements at Defence Equipment and Support in February 2016 and General Officer Commanding Regional Command in June 2017. Capps became Commandant of the Royal Military Academy Sandhurst on 27 March 2020, and served as such until August 2022. He retired from the army in December 2022.

Capps was appointed a Commander of the Order of the British Empire on 21 March 2014.

References

|-

1966 births
British Army personnel of the War in Afghanistan (2001–2021)
Military personnel from Berkshire
Living people
British Army major generals
Commanders of the Order of the British Empire
Commandants of Sandhurst
Royal Corps of Transport officers
Alumni of Cranfield University
People from Slough